Franklin B. Wellock, (August 11, 1839June 29, 1902) was a 19th-century American Boston maritime pilot. He is best known for being with the Boston pilot service for over 55 years. He was captain and owner of the pilot boat Minerva.

Early life

Captain Franklin B. Wellock was born in Chelsea, Massachusetts on August 11, 1839. He was the son of Charles Henry Wellock and Eliza Campbell. Wellock was married to Harriet L. Slack and had five children. His son, Samuel Franklin Wellock, was connected with the Boston pilot-boat America No. 1, when he was delegated the duty of throwing the ashes of the late Captain Franklin Fowler off the deck of the America, on April 29, 1902.

As a boy, he sold newspapers on the ferryboat of the Eastern Railroad. He was near the railroad during the great gale of April 1851 that destroyed the Minot's Ledge Light. He knew Andrew Carney, who built the Carney Hospital. When he was 13 years old, he went to sea and cruised on the fishing schooner Hope, of Provincetown.

Career

Wellock was a Boston pilot for more than 55 years. In 1855, he began his career as a pilot on the pilot-boat Friend. On July 6, 1859, Wellock received his full commission as a pilot. He was attached to the pilot-boats Friend, No. 7, Phantom I, William Starkey, No. 2, Phantom II, Gracie, Pet, Fleur de Lis, and Eben D. Jordan, No. 2. He owned and sailed the Fleurde-Lis, for two years, then sold her to a Boston party when she was converted into a pleasure yacht. He built the Moses H. Grinnell and the Minerva. During the American Civil War, he did service for the government in the Boston area.

On July 15, 1894, Amy Robsart, from the Boston Post, tells a story about a two day trip with Wellock on the pilot boat Sylph, No. 8. They went cruising between Nahant and Minots Ledge, Massachusetts and experienced boarding and taking off pilots from incoming vessels.

Wellock was captain and owner of the pilot boat Minerva, No. 7, built in 1896 by the Ambrose A. Martin shipyard at Jeffries Point. The pilot-boat was named for his daughter, Minerva Hill Wellock. She went on her trial trip on March 14, 1896 from the National dock at East Boston. Captain Wellock was in command and sailed the boat out of Boston Harbor, past Fort Warren, Fort Winthrop and then on to the Brewster Islands. In 1900, Wellock's son, Samuel F. Wellock, was a pilot on the Minerva.

On May 28, 1897, Wellock and Joseph W. Colby brought in the battleship Massachusetts and cruiser New York. Colby was in charge of bringing up the New York and Wellock was in charge of the Massachusetts.

Death

On June 29, 1902, Wellock died in East Boston. He was 63 years old. He was buried at the family plot in the Woodlawn cemetery in Everett, Massachusetts.

See also
 List of Northeastern U. S. Pilot Boats

References

People from Boston
1851 births
1913 deaths
Maritime pilotage
Sea captains